Ippolito Desideri or Hippolyte Desideri (21 December 1684 – 14 April 1733) was an Italian Jesuit missionary and traveller and the most famous of the early European missionaries to visit Tibet. He was the first documented European to have successfully studied and understood Tibetan language and culture.

Biography
Desideri was born in 1684 to a fairly prosperous family in Pistoia, Tuscany. He was educated from childhood in the Jesuit school in Pistoja, and in 1700 was selected to attend the Collegio Romano (Roman College) in Rome. From 1706 to 1710 he taught literature at the Jesuit colleges in Orvieto and Arezzo, and later at the Collegio Romano itself.

Journey to Tibet
His application for the Indies mission was accepted by the Father-General of the Society of Jesus, Michelangelo Tamburini, in 1712, and he was assigned to reopen the Tibetan mission, which was under the jurisdiction of the Jesuit Province of Goa. Desideri left Rome on 27 September 1712, and embarked for the East from Lisbon on a Portuguese vessel, arriving in Goa one year later. From Goa he traveled to Surat, Ahmedabad, Rajasthan and Delhi, arriving in Agra (the seat of the Jesuit mission in Northern India) on 15 September 1714. From there he returned to Delhi, where he met his superior and travel companion, the Portuguese Jesuit Manoel Freyre. Together they traveled from Delhi to Srinagar in Kashmir (where they were delayed for six months, and Desideri suffered a nearly fatal intestinal illness), and from Kashmir to Leh, capital of Ladakh, arriving there at the end of June, 1715.  According to Desideri, they were well received by the king of Ladakh and his court, and he wished to remain there to found a mission, but he was forced to obey his Superior, Freyre, who insisted that they travel to Central Tibet and Lhasa.

They thus undertook a perilous seven months winter journey across the Tibetan plateau; ill-prepared and inexperienced, their very survival was likely due to the help they received from Casal, the Mongol governor (and widow of the previous governor of Western Tibet), who was leaving her post and returning to Lhasa. They journeyed with her armed caravan, and finally arrived in Lhasa on 18 March 1716. After a few weeks Freyre returned to India, via Kathmandu and Patna, leaving Desideri in charge of the mission. He was the only European missionary in Tibet, at that time.

Settling down in Lhasa
Soon after arriving in Lhasa, Desideri was received in audience by the Mongol ruler of Tibet, Lhasang Khan, who gave him permission to rent a house in Lhasa and to practice and teach Christianity. After reading Desideri's first work in Tibetan, on the basics of Catholic doctrine, Lasang Khan advised him to improve his Tibetan and learn the Tibetan Buddhist religious and philosophical literature. After some months of intensive study he entered the Sera monastic university, one of the three great seats of learning of the politically involved Gelukpa. There he studied and debated with Tibetan monks and scholars, and was permitted to have a Christian chapel in his rooms. He learned the language (unknown to Europeans before) and became a voracious student of the culture.

At the end of 1717 he was forced to leave Lhasa due to the unrest caused by the invasion of the Dzungar Mongols. He retired to the Capuchin hospice in Dakpo province, in South Central Tibet, although he did return to Lhasa for considerable periods during the period 1719–1720. Between 1718 and 1721 he composed five works in literary Tibetan, in which he taught Christian doctrines and attempted to refute the Buddhist concepts of rebirth (which he referred to as "metempsychosis") and 'Emptiness' (Wylie: stong pa nyid; Sanskrit: śunyatā). In these books Desideri utilized the Tibetan Buddhist techniques of scholastic argumentation, and accepted parts of Buddhism that he did not see as contradictory to Catholic teaching, especially Buddhist moral philosophy.

Conflict with the Capuchins
Italian missionaries of the Capuchin Order had been granted the Tibetan mission in 1703 by the Propaganda Fide, the branch of the Church administration that controlled Catholic missionary activity worldwide.  Three Capuchins arrived in Lhasa in October 1716, and promptly presented documents to Desideri that they claimed confirmed their exclusive right to the Tibetan mission by the Propaganda. Desideri contested the charge of disobedience to the Propaganda Fide, and both sides complained to Rome. In the meantime Desideri helped his Capuchin co-religionists in acclimating to Tibet. While the Capuchins had no quarrel with Desideri personally, they feared that other Jesuits would follow and displace them from Tibet and Nepal, and they petitioned for his expulsion from the country. In January 1721, Desideri received the order to leave Tibet and return to India. After a long stay in Kuti, at the Tibetan-Nepali border, he returned to Agra in 1722.

Later years

At Agra, Desideri was appointed head pastor of the Catholic community in the Mughal capital of Delhi. He organized education and services for the community, and had a new church built to replace the former dilapidated edifice. In 1725 he went to the French Jesuit Malabar mission in Pondicherry, and set to work learning the Tamil language and carrying on the mission there. In 1727 he was sent to Rome to promote the cause of the beatification of John de Britto, a Jesuit who had died a martyr in South-India.  He took along his very extensive notes on Tibet, its culture and religion, and began work on his Relation, which in its latest manuscript was called "Historical Notices of Tibet" (Notizie Istoriche del Tibet) while still homeward bound on a French vessel. He landed in France in August 1727, and after a stay in that country, where he met with important cardinals and aristocrats and had an audience with King Louis XV, he arrived in Rome in January 1728. He took up residence in the Jesuit professed house, and his time was fully occupied in the legal proceedings at the Propaganda Fide between himself, representing the Jesuit order, and Fr. Felice di Montecchio, who fiercely prosecuted the Capuchin case; Desideri wrote three Defenses of the Jesuit position. On 29 November 1732, the Propaganda issued its final terse order on the matter, confirming the exclusive right of the Capuchins to the Tibet mission, and forbidding any further discussion on the subject.

Desideri had been working during this time on revising the Relation and was preparing it for publication, which was forbidden by the Propaganda order. Manuscripts of this monumental work, comprising the first accurate account of Tibetan geography, government, agriculture, customs, and Tibetan Buddhist philosophy and belief, were buried in the Jesuit archives and a private collection, and did not come to light until the late 19th century; the Relation finally appeared in a complete edition by Luciano Petech which was published in the 1950s. An abridged English translation was published in 1937, and a complete translation in 2010.

Main works
"Mission to Tibet: The Extraordinary Eighteenth-Century Account of Father Ippolito Desideri S.J." Trans. by Michael Sweet, Ed. by Leonard Zwilling (Boston: Wisdom Publications, 2010)
 Ippolito Desideri: An Account of Tibet. The Travels of Ippolito Desideri of Pistoia, S.J., 1712–1727. Edited by Filippo De Filippi, with an introduction by C. Wessels, S.J. London: George Routledge & Sons, Ltd. 1932 (The Broadway Travellers)
Opere Tibetane di Ippolito Desideri S.J. Edited by Giuseppe Toscano (4 vol., 1981–1989)
Historical Notices of Tibet and Recollections of My Journeys, and the Mission Founded There (Relation), and other works, edited by Luciano Petech (1954–1957, in Petech,"Missionari Italiani nel Tibet e nel Nepal" (Rome: Libraria dello Stato, 1954–57),vols. 5–7.
"Dispelling the Darkness. A Jesuit's Quest for the Soul of Tibet." Donald S. Lopez Jr. and Thupten Jinpa, Trans. and eds. (Cambridge: Harvard University Press, 2017)

See also

 António de Andrade
 Estêvão Cacella
 Johann Grueber
 Bento de Goes

References

Sources
 
 

{{cite book|last=Castello Panti|first= S.|title= Ippolito Desideri e il Tibet|location=Pistoia|year=1984}}

Sweet, M.J. "The Devil's Stratagem or Human Fraud: Ippolito Desideri on the Reincarnate Succession of the Dalai Lama" Buddhist-Christian Studies, 29, 2009, 131–140.

Pomplun, T. Jesuit on the Roof of the World: Ippolito Desideri's Mission to Tibet (New York: Oxford University Press, 2010).
Michael J. Sweet, An Unpublished Letter in Portuguese of Father Ippolito Desideri, S.J., in AHSI'', vol.79 (2010), p. 29

External links
Ippolito Desideri, Il Tibet e il buddhismo

Desideri. Ippolito
1733 deaths
People from Pistoia
18th-century Italian Jesuits
Italian Roman Catholic missionaries
Tibetologists
Christian missionaries in Central Asia
Jesuit missionaries in Tibet
Explorers of Central Asia
Jesuit missionaries in India
Explorers of India
Italian travel writers
Explorers of Nepal